Autocharis jacobsalis is a moth in the family Crambidae. It was described by Hubert Marion and Pierre Viette in 1956. It is found in Madagascar and South Africa.

References

Moths described in 1956
Odontiinae
Moths of Africa